Nicolas Mercier (born 30 January 2003) is a French professional footballer who plays as a forward for  club Avranches, on loan from Auxerre.

Club career
A former youth academy player of Versailles, Mercier joined Auxerre in 2018. On 2 October 2020, he signed his first professional contract with the club. He made his professional debut for the club on 2 August 2021 in a 3–0 league win against Grenoble.

On 28 July 2022, Mercier was loaned to Avranches.

International career
Mercier is a French youth international. He has appeared in friendlies for under-16 and under-17 teams.

Career statistics

Club

References

External links
 
 

2003 births
Living people
Footballers from Paris
Association football forwards
French footballers
France youth international footballers
Ligue 2 players
Championnat National 2 players
Championnat National 3 players
AJ Auxerre players
US Avranches players